Cochise (Apache: Shi-ka-She or A-da-tli-chi, lit.: having the quality or strength of an oak; later K'uu-ch'ish or Cheis, lit. oak; June 8, 1874) was leader of the Chihuicahui local group of the Chokonen and principal nantan of the Chokonen band of the Chiricahua Apache. A key war leader during the Apache Wars, he led an uprising that began in 1861 and persisted until a peace treaty was negotiated in 1872. Cochise County is named after him.

Biography
Cochise (or "Cheis") was one of the most noted Apache leaders (along with Geronimo and Mangas Coloradas) to resist intrusions by Mexicans and Americans during the 19th century. He was described as a large man (for the time), with a muscular frame, classical features, and long, black hair, which he wore in traditional Apache style. In his own language, his name Cheis meant "having the quality or strength of oak."

Cochise and the Chokonen-Chiricahua lived in the area that is now the northern region of Sonora, Mexico; New Mexico, and Arizona, which they had settled in sometime before the arrival of the European explorers and colonists.  As Spain and later Mexico attempted to gain dominion over the Chiricahua lands, the indigenous groups became increasingly resistant. Cycles of warfare developed, which the Apache mostly won. Eventually, the Spanish tried a different approach; they tried to make the Apache dependent (thereby placating them), giving them older firearms and liquor rations issued by the colonial government (this was called the "Galvez Peace Policy"). After Mexico gained independence from Spain and took control of this territory, it ended the practice, perhaps lacking the resources (and/or possibly the will) to continue it. The various Chiricahua bands resumed raiding in the 1830s to acquire what they wanted after the Mexicans stopped selling these goods to them.

As a result, the Mexican government began a series of military operations to stop the raiding by the Chiricahua, but they were fought to a standstill by the Apache. Cochise's father was killed in the fighting. Cochise deepened his resolve, and the Chiricahua Apache pursued vengeance against the Mexicans. Mexican forces captured Cochise at one point in 1848 during an Apache raid on Fronteras, Sonora, but he was exchanged for nearly a dozen Mexican prisoners.

Border tensions and fighting
Beginning with early Spanish colonization around 1600, the Apache suffered tension and strife with European settlers until the greater part of the area was acquired by the United States in 1850 following the Mexican War. For a time, the two peoples managed peaceful relations. In the late 1850s, Cochise may have supplied firewood for the Butterfield Overland Mail stagecoach station at Apache Pass.

The tenuous peace did not last, as American encroachment into Apache territory continued. In 1861, the Bascom affair was a catalyst for armed confrontation. An Apache raiding party had driven away a local rancher's cattle and kidnapped his 12-year-old stepson (Felix Ward, who later became known as Mickey Free). Cochise and his band were mistakenly accused of the incident (which had been carried out by another band, Coyotero Apache).  Army officer Lt. George Bascom invited Cochise to the Army's encampment in the belief that the warrior was responsible for the incident. Cochise maintained his innocence and offered to look into the matter with other Apache groups, but the officer tried to arrest him. Cochise escaped by drawing a knife and slashing his way out of the tent, but was shot at as he fled.

Bascom captured some of Cochise's relatives, who apparently were taken by surprise as Cochise escaped. Cochise eventually also took hostages to use in negotiations to free the Apache Indians.  However, the negotiations fell apart, because the arrival of U.S. troop reinforcements led Cochise to believe that the situation was spiraling out of his control. Both sides eventually killed all their remaining hostages. Cochise went on to carry out about 11 years of relentless warfare, reducing much of the Mexican/American settlements in southern Arizona to a burned-out wasteland. Dan Thrapp estimated the total death toll of settlers and Mexican/American travelers as 5,000, but most historians believe it was more likely a few hundred. The mistaken arrest of Cochise by Lt. Bascom is still remembered by the Chiricahua's descendants today, who describe the incident as "Cut the Tent".

Cochise joined with his father-in-law Mangas Coloradas (Red Sleeves, Kan-da-zis Tlishishen), the powerful Chihenne-Chiricahua chief, in a long series of retaliatory skirmishes and raids on the white settlements and ranches. The Battle of Dragoon Springs was one of these engagements. During the raids, many people were killed, but the Apache quite often had the upper hand. The United States was distracted by its own internal conflict of the looming Civil War, and had begun to pull military forces out of the area. Additionally, the Apaches were highly adapted to living and fighting in the harsh terrain of the Southwest. Many years passed before the US Army, using tactics conceived by General George Crook and later adopted by General Nelson A. Miles, was able to effectively challenge the Apache warriors on their own lands.

Battle of Apache Pass
At Apache Pass in 1862, Cochise and Mangas Coloradas, with around 500 fighters, held their ground against a New Mexico-bound force of California volunteers under General James Henry Carleton until carriage-mounted howitzer artillery fire was brought to bear on their positions in the rocks above.

According to scout John C. Cremony and historian Dan L. Thrapp, the howitzer fire sent the Apaches into an immediate retreat. The Battle of Apache Pass was one of the rare pitched battles the Apaches fought against the Army. Normally, the Apaches' tactics involved guerrilla-style warfare. Capt. Thomas Roberts was persuaded by this conflict that it would be best to find a route around Apache Pass, which he did. Gen. Carleton continued unhindered to New Mexico and subsequently took over as commander of the territory.

In January 1863, Gen. Joseph R. West, under orders from Gen. Carleton, captured Mangas Coloradas by luring him into a conference under a flag of truce. During what was to be a peaceful parley session, the Americans took Mangas Coloradas prisoner and later murdered him. This fanned the flames of enmity between the encroaching Americans and the Apache. Cochise believed that the Americans had violated the rules of war by capturing and killing Mangas Coloradas during a parley session. Cochise and the Apache continued their raids against U.S. and Mexican settlements and military positions throughout the 1860s.

Capture, escape and retirement

Following various skirmishes, Cochise and his men were gradually driven into Arizona's Dragoon Mountains, but used the mountains for cover and as a base from which to continue attacks against white settlements. Cochise evaded capture and continued his raids against white settlements and travelers until 1872. In 1871, General Oliver O. Howard was ordered to find Cochise, and in 1872, Howard was accompanied by his aide 1st Lt Joseph A. Sladen and Captain Samuel S. Sumner to Arizona to negotiate a peace treaty with Cochise. Tom Jeffords, the Apache leader's only white friend, was also present. A treaty was negotiated on October 12, 1872. Based on statements by Sumner and descriptions by Sladen, modern historians such as Robert M. Utley believe that Cochise's Spanish interpreter was Geronimo.

After the peace treaty, Cochise retired to the short-lived Chiricahua Reservation (1872–1876), with his friend Jeffords as agent. He died of natural causes (probably abdominal cancer) in 1874, and was buried in the rocks above one of his favorite camps in Arizona's Dragoon Mountains, now called the Cochise Stronghold. Only his people and Tom Jeffords knew the exact location of his resting place, and they took the secret to their graves.

Many of Cochise's descendants reside at the Mescalero Apache Reservation near Ruidoso, New Mexico, and in Oklahoma with the Fort Sill Apache Tribe of Chiricahua Warm Springs Apache.

Whether a portrait of Cochise exists is unknown; a reported portrait is actually that of a 1903 Pueblo of Isleta man named Juan Rey Abeita.

Family
Cochise married Dos-teh-seh (Dos-tes-ey, Doh-teh-seh – "Something-at-the-campfire-already-cooked", b. 1838), the daughter of Mangas Coloradas, who was the leader of the Warm Springs and Mimbreño local groups of the Chihenne band. Their children were Taza (1842–1876) and Naiche (1856–1919).

In popular culture

The best-selling novel by Elliott Arnold in 1947 titled Blood Brother gives a fictionalized account of the latter part of the struggle and friendship between Tom Jeffords and Cochise.
In 1950, director Delmer Daves turned Arnold's novel into a film retitled Broken Arrow, featuring James Stewart as Tom Jeffords and Jeff Chandler as Cochise. Broken Arrow is often credited as the first sound film to show a sympathetic picture of Native Americans and influenced the popular image of Native American people. The tall, handsome, deeply tanned Chandler, a Jewish actor born in Brooklyn, New York, portrayed Cochise as a noble, nearly tragic character forced to fight against the U.S. Army officers who led incursions into Apache territory.
John Ford's representation of Cochise in the 1948 film Fort Apache was also positive to Native Americans, although in that film, Cochise spoke Spanish (a language the Apaches had learned from their Mexican enemies). The film Conquest of Cochise released by Columbia Pictures in 1953 and starring John Hodiak as Cochise also showed Cochise as a caring man who wanted peace with whites. Broken Arrow is a TV series adapted from the 1950 film that told a fictionalized account of the historical relationship between Tom Jeffords (John Lupton) and Cochise (Michael Ansara); the show was aired on ABC in prime time from 1956 through 1958. Cochise was portrayed by Jeff Morrow in a 1961 episode of Bonanza.
"Cochise" is an instrumental piece in the album Guitars, by Mike Oldfield.
Audioslave's debut single "Cochise" is named after the chief. In an interview, guitarist Tom Morello said that Cochise was "the last great American Indian chief to die free and absolutely unconquered. When several members of his family were captured, tortured, and hanged by the U.S. Cavalry, Cochise declared war on the entire Southwest.... Cochise the avenger, fearless and resolute, attacked everything in his path with an unbridled fury."
The 2008 novel by Melody Groves titled Arizona War: A Colton Brothers Saga gives a fictionalized account of Cochise's dealings with the main characters, James and Trace Colton, during the early 1860s, including the Bascom affair of 1861 and the New Mexico-bound force of California volunteers under General James Henry Carleton during 1862.
Wes Studi portrays Cochise in A Million Ways to Die in the West despite the film being set in 1882, eight years after Cochise's death.
A statue of Cochise is shown as a meeting point between friends Jaime Reyes and Tye Longshadow in the Young Justice episode "Beneath".
A small lunar crater was named after Cochise, located near the landing site in the Taurus–Littrow valley, by the astronauts of Apollo 17.
Phoenix-area theme park, Legend City (now defunct), featured a popular animatronic river ride called Cochise's Stronghold.
An alien from the TV show Falling Skies is nicknamed "Cochise" by his human allies.
Sculptor John Raimondi created a sculpture dedicated to Cochise in 2010. This sculpture, when realized in full scale, will tower 51 feet in height. However, to date, this sculpture has only been fabricated on a smaller scale.

References

Further reading
 Bourke, John G. (1971). On the Border with Crook. Lincoln: University of Nebraska Press.  . .
 Nichols, Roger L. Warrior Nations: The United States and Indian Peoples. Norman, OK: University of Oklahoma Press, 2013.
 
 Sweeney, Edward R. (2008) Making Peace with Cochise: The 1872 Journal of Captain Joseph Alton Sladen. Norman: University of Oklahoma Press, 2008. .

External links
 Chiricahua Apache Nation
   Note that the first photo in Find a Grave is actually not Cochise.  That photo is a popular one of Chato (Apache) from the Smithsonian's National Anthropological Archives:  See Portrait of Chief Chato in Native Dress 1886. Since the photo was taken in 1886, Cochise was long gone (he died in 1874).  The second photo in Find a Grave is of Eskiminzin, the Aravapai Apache leader.

19th-century Native Americans
Apache Wars
Native American people of the Indian Wars
Native American leaders
Chiricahua people
Native American people from Arizona
People from New Mexico
People of the American Old West
American folklore
1800s births
1874 deaths